Carlos Alberto Rodrigues Barbosa (15 February 1954 – 7 March 1982) was a Brazilian footballer. He died after suffering a heart attack during a game against XV de Jaú.

Career statistics

Club

References

1954 births
1982 deaths
Brazilian footballers
Brazil youth international footballers
Brazil international footballers
Association football defenders
Campeonato Brasileiro Série A players
Santa Cruz Futebol Clube players
Sport Club Internacional players
Sport Club do Recife players
Association football players who died while playing
Sport deaths in Brazil
Sportspeople from Recife